The Big Clock is a 1948 American film noir directed by John Farrow and adapted by novelist-screenwriter Jonathan Latimer from the 1946 novel of the same title by Kenneth Fearing.

The black-and-white film is set in New York City, and stars Ray Milland, Charles Laughton and Maureen O'Sullivan. Elsa Lanchester and Harry Morgan, in an early film role, also appear. Noel Neill has an uncredited part as an elevator operator very early in the film.

Plot
George Stroud, editor-in-chief of Crimeways magazine, hides from building security inside the "big clock," which is the largest and most sophisticated clock ever built. The clock dominates the lobby of the Janoth Publications building in New York City, where Stroud works.

Thirty-six hours earlier, Stroud is eager to embark on a long-postponed honeymoon in Wheeling, West Virginia with his wife Georgette and son. His tyrannical boss Earl Janoth wants him to stay to pursue a missing-person story that Stroud has just cracked, but Stroud refuses and Janoth fires him. Stroud goes to a bar to drink and is distracted by the attentions of Janoth's glamorous mistress Pauline York, who proposes a blackmail plan against Janoth. When Stroud loses track of time and misses the train for West Virginia, Georgette angrily leaves without him. Stroud spends the evening drinking with York, and he buys a painting and a sundial.

Stroud and York go to her apartment, but York sees Janoth arriving and Stroud leaves. Janoth sees someone leaving but does not recognize Stroud in the dark. Janoth assumes that York is cheating on him, leading to a quarrel in which he strikes York with the sundial, killing her. Janoth goes to his assistant Hagen and tells him what happened, intending to surrender to the police and confess. However, Hagen convinces him that they can frame the man whom Janoth saw leaving York's apartment for the crime. Janoth decides to use the resources of Crimeways to find the man instead of calling the police.

Stroud has since caught up with his wife and son in West Virginia and tells her that he has been fired, but leaves out his adventures with York. Janoth calls to rehire him in order to lead the effort to find the mystery man (without any mention of York). He discloses enough details for Stroud to know that the mystery man is Stroud himself. He reluctantly agrees to return to his job and lead the manhunt, to Georgette's disappointment.

During the manhunt, Stroud must appear to lead the investigation diligently while also preventing the investigation from identifying him as the culprit. He must also secretly conduct his own investigation to prove Janoth's guilt.

Eventually York is identified by the Crimeways team and witnesses are found who saw her on the town with the mystery man. The witnesses are brought to the Janoth Building. One is eccentric artist Louise Patterson, who created the painting that Stroud purchased. Asked to paint a portrait of the mystery man, she produces a modernist abstract of blobs and swirls.

Stroud tries to avoid the witnesses, but one of them sees and recognizes him as the mystery man. Stroud slips away before the witness identifies him to the investigators, who now know that the mystery man is in the building but do not know his identity. All exits from the building are sealed, and the building's occupants must leave by the main door, with the witnesses watching for the mystery man. Building security men sweep the building to find the wanted man.

Stroud evades the dragnet by various maneuvers, finally hiding in the clock. He confronts Janoth and Hagen and presents evidence that appears to point to Hagen as the killer. Hagen implores Janoth to clear him, but Janoth tells him only that he will provide him with the best possible legal defense. Enraged, Hagen turns on Janoth and reveals that Janoth killed York and that he helped with the coverup. Janoth shoots Hagen and tries to escape in an elevator, but the car is stuck floors below (jammed there by Stroud earlier while evading the security men). Janoth falls down the elevator shaft to his death.

Cast

 Ray Milland as George Stroud
 Charles Laughton as Earl Janoth
 Maureen O'Sullivan as Georgette Stroud
 George Macready as Steve Hagen
 Rita Johnson as Pauline York
 Elsa Lanchester as Louise Patterson 
 Henry Morgan as Bill Womack
 Harold Vermilyea as Don Klausmeyer 
 Dan Tobin as Ray Cordette
 Richard Webb as Nat Sperling 
 Elaine Riley as Lily Gold 
 Luis Van Rooten as Edwin Orlin, a reporter 
 Douglas Spencer as Bert Finch, a reporter 
 Bobby Watson as Morton Spaulding
 Lloyd Corrigan as Colonel Jefferson Randolph aka McKinley 
 Frank Orth as Burt 
 Margaret Field as Second Secretary
 Noel Neill as Elevator Operator (uncredited)
 Al Ferguson as Guard (uncredited) 

Morgan's screen name later would become "Henry 'Harry' Morgan" and eventually Harry Morgan, to avoid confusion with the popular humorist of the same name.

Production
Paramount bought the rights to the novel before publication. (Fearing's earlier novel The Hospital (1939) had been a best seller.) The purchase price was a reported $45,000.

Jonathan Latimer was assigned to write the script and Ray Milland to star. Leslie Fenton was announced as director but he was held up on Saigon so John Farrow took over. Filming began February 17, 1947. Charles Laughton was cast as the villain.

This was Maureen O'Sullivan's first film in five years, since Tarzan's New York Adventure, after which she had concentrated on raising her family. She did it as a favor for her husband, director John Farrow.

Reception
The film was very well received by critics, and as of October 23, 2022, holds a 100% "Fresh" rating on Rotten Tomatoes.

Bosley Crowther of The New York Times extolled the film's virtues as a thriller, writing, "When you hear the musical chime at the end of this ticking review of The Big Clock, it will be exactly the time for all devotees of detective films to make a mental memorandum to see it without possible fail." He added that the film "is a dandy clue-chaser of the modern chromium-plated type [and] requires close attention from the start ... Scriptwriter Jonathan Latimer and Director John Farrow have fetched a film which is fast-moving, humorous, atmospheric and cumulative of suspense."

Film critic Bruce Eder wrote, "The Big Clock is a near-perfect match for the book, telling in generally superb visual style a tale set against the backdrop of upscale 1940s New York and offering an early (but accurate) depiction of the modern media industry."

In a 1996 essay film noir historians Alain Silver and James Ursini discussed Farrow's technique: "Narration and long take are combined to enhance suspense...but the other items of noir style, the dark cityscape, the camera moves, the low-key sets, all these are used to disorient the viewer."

In 1998, film writer David N. Meyer wrote, "More screwball comedy than noir, The Big Clock's big moments derive from snappy dialogue and over-the-top humor."

Dennis Schwartz wrote in 2004 that "John Farrow directs this thrilling psychological film noir with style, though it's barely a work of noir in the full sense of that genre."

In 2001, the American Film Institute nominated this film for AFI's 100 Years...100 Thrills.

Remakes
The story was remade in 1976 as Police Python 357 and in 1987 as No Way Out with Kevin Costner. The 1948 film is closest to the novel. The 1976 remake, on the other hand, updated the events to the Orléans Police Department in France, whereas the 1987 remake updated the events to the United States Department of Defense in Washington, D.C. during the Cold War.

References

External links
 
 
 
 
 
 
 The Big Clock trailer at YouTube

Streaming audio
 The Big Clock on Screen Directors Playhouse: July 8, 1949

1948 films
1940s thriller films
American thriller films
American black-and-white films
Film noir
Films about journalists
Films based on American novels
Films based on crime novels
Films set in Manhattan
Films set in New York City
Paramount Pictures films
Films directed by John Farrow
Films scored by Victor Young
1940s English-language films
1940s American films